Screen Savers or screensaver or variation, may refer to:

 Screensaver, computer programs intended to preserve CRT monitors from "burn-in"
 GNOME Screensaver, GNOME Project's screen blanking tool
 Google Pack Screensaver, a terminal inactivity screen photo displayer included in the Google Pack
 The Screen Savers, a technology-oriented television program that aired on TechTV and later G4

See also
 XScreenSaver, X/Windows screensaver collection
 Flying toaster screensaver
 The New Screen Savers, technology webcast on TWIT.tv
 Screenslaver, a character from Disney/Pixar film The Incredibles 2
 Screen (disambiguation)
 Saver (disambiguation)